Shawia may refer to:
the Shawia people
the Shawia language